"Oben ohne" is a song recorded in 1982 by Austrian singer Rainhard Fendrich. It reached #9 in the Austrian charts.

1982 singles
Rainhard Fendrich songs
1982 songs